Lucia Catullo (10 September 1927 – 31 December 1985) was an Italian actress and dancer known primarily for playing dramatic roles in the Radiotelevisione Italiana.

Biography 
Lucia was born in Bari, Italy, and studied at the Accademia Nazionale di Arte Drammatica Silvio D'Amico. His theater debut was in Teatro Stabile di Torino, and her television debut was playing a small role in Macbeth, an Italian version produced by the RAI in 1960.

His film work includes Monika, directed by Mario Imperoli, and Terrible Day of the Big Gundown, a Spaghetti Western directed by Sergio Garrone.

Filmography

References

External links 
 

1927 births
1985 deaths
20th-century Italian actresses
Italian female dancers
Italian voice actresses
People from Bari